Hluk is a town in Uherské Hradiště District in the Zlín Region of the Czech Republic. It has about 4,200 inhabitants.

Etymology
The name of Hluk is very likely derived from Latin word hlucium. It probably got its name from the noisy flowing water of the Okluky stream.

Geography
It lies in the Vizovice Highlands on the Okluky stream.

In the municipal territory are the nature reserve Kobylí hlava and the nature monuments Okluky and Pod Husí horou.

History
The first written mention of Hluk is from 1294. However, the first mention of the wider region called Lucké pole Province is from the 11th century. A wooden fortress in Hluk is first documented in 1303.

Economy
In Hluk there are two significant industrial producers. Hanon Systems Autopal company operates a factory for refrigeration and air conditioning components for the automotive industry.

Niob is a company focused on the development, design and manufacture of equipment for the food industry. Since its founding in 1992, it acts as a technical base of the parent company Inotec GmbH.

Culture
Hluk lies in the cultural region of Moravian Slovakia. The town is known for its folklore festival Ride of the Kings which is on the UNESCO Intangible Cultural Heritage List. It is held every three years, on the first weekend in July. This folk tradition commemorates historic event, when King Matthias Corvinus fled through Hluk in female disguise after losing the battle.

At present, there is a tradition maintained style when through the town is decorated with ribbons and decorated horses transported the little boy in the women national costumes of Hluk, accompanied by costumed lads. The parade is accompanied by hundreds of costumed citizens of the town, surrounding municipalities, foreign and domestic ensembles.

The Ride of the Kings is also linked to the annual brass band festival and a folklore festival.

Sights

The Hluk Fortress is the landmark of the town. Today it houses the tourist information centre, a library, a ceremonial hall, and spaces for cultural and social events.

In the Rajčovňa street, there are historic houses protected as cultural monuments. Theay are built of unfired bricks, with walls covered with screed of barley chaff, clay and water, repainted with lime. Their roofs of burnt tiles used to be thatched. The houses contain period furniture and fittings.

The parish Church of Saint Lawrence was built in the Baroque style in 1735–1741.

Notable people
Käthe Odwody (1909–1997), Austrian resistance activist

Twin towns – sister cities

Hluk is twinned with:
 Nemšová, Slovakia
 Planá nad Lužnicí, Czech Republic

Gallery

References

External links

Hluk Chronicle

Cities and towns in the Czech Republic
Populated places in Uherské Hradiště District
Moravian Slovakia